The Mobley Hotel is a historic hotel located in Cisco, Texas. It was the first hotel owned by Conrad Hilton, founder of Hilton Hotels. It is a two-story brick building.

History 
In 1916, Henry Mobley opened the hotel. Most of its guests came from the nearby railway station. Mobley capitalized on the local oil boom by renting out rooms for 8 hour periods that coincided with the shifts in the oil fields.

In 1919, Conrad Hilton purchased the hotel for $40,000, the first hotel he ever purchased. Hilton emphasizes minimum cost and maximum comfort, a philosophy he summed up with the word "minimax." In 1929, Hilton sold the hotel. During the Depression, the hotel fell into disrepair. In 1956, it was used as a senior citizens home. In 1977, the hotel became a memorial museum for Hilton.

References 

National Register of Historic Places in Eastland County, Texas